The Salem Cemetery is located at 301 Cemetery St. in Winston-Salem, North Carolina.

Notable burials
 William Robertson Boggs (1829–1911), Confederate Army General
 Richard Thurmond Chatham (1896–1957), businessman, politician
 Thomas Henry Davis (1918–1999), aviator, founder of Piedmont Airlines
 Cornelia Deaderick Glenn (1854–1926), First Lady of North Carolina
 Robert Broadnax Glenn (1854–1920), Governor of North Carolina
 Margaret Nowell Graham (1867–1942), artist
 John Wesley Hanes (1850–1903), businessman
 Rufus Lenoir Patterson (1830–1879), businessman, politician
 Richard Joshua Reynolds (1850–1918), founder of R.J. Reynolds Tobacco Company
 Zachary Smith Reynolds (1911–1932), aviator
 Augustine Henry Shepperd (1792–1864), politician
 Florence Wells Slater (1864–1941), scientist and teacher

References

External links
 
 

Cemeteries in North Carolina
Geography of Winston-Salem, North Carolina